Trochocercus is a genus of bird in the family Monarchidae. Described by Jean Cabanis in 1850, the name Trochocercus is a combination of the Greek words trokhos meaning "circular" or "round" and kerkos, meaning "tail".

Taxonomy and systematics

Extant species
After three former species were transferred to the genus Elminia in 2009, the genus Trochocercus now contains the following two remaining species:

Former species
Formerly, some authorities also considered the following species (or subspecies) as species within the genus Trochocercus:
 Bedford's paradise flycatcher (as Trochocercus bedfordi)
 Dusky crested flycatcher (as Trochocercus nigromitratus)
 White-bellied crested flycatcher (as Trochocercus albiventris)
 White-tailed crested flycatcher (as Trochocercus albicaudatus or Trochocercus albonotata)

References

 
Monarchidae
Bird genera
 
Taxonomy articles created by Polbot